Maria Gąsienica Bukowa-Kowalska (2 January 1936  – 27 December 2020) was a Polish cross-country skier. She competed in the women's 10 km and the women's 3 × 5 km relay events at the 1956 Winter Olympics.

Cross-country skiing results

Olympic Games

World Championships

References

External links
 

1936 births
2020 deaths
Polish female cross-country skiers
Olympic cross-country skiers of Poland
Cross-country skiers at the 1956 Winter Olympics
People from Tatra County